FTV-1132, also known as the Corona 9042A, was an American area survey optical reconnaissance satellite which was launched in 1962. It was a KH-5 Argon satellite, based on an Agena-B. The satellite operated successfully, but its film capsule was lost during recovery due to a parachute failure.

The launch of FTV-1132 occurred at 20:39 UTC on 1 September 1962.  A Thor DM-21 Agena-B rocket was used, flying from Launch Complex 75-3-5 at the Vandenberg Air Force Base. Upon successfully reaching orbit, it was assigned the Harvard designation 1962 Alpha Upsilon 1.

Images were recorded onto  film, and returned in a Satellite Recovery Vehicle, before the satellite ceased operations. The Satellite Recovery Vehicle used by FTV-1132 was SRV-600. Following atmospheric reentry, SRV-600 was to have been collected in mid-air by a Fairchild C-119J Flying Boxcar aircraft, but when this was attempted the parachute separated from the spacecraft, causing the capsule to fall into the sea. FTV-1132 decayed from orbit on 26 October 1964.

References

Spacecraft launched in 1962
Spacecraft which reentered in 1964